Donald James Cooper (born January 15, 1956) is an American former Major League Baseball (MLB) pitcher who spent parts of four seasons with the Minnesota Twins (1981–1982), Toronto Blue Jays (1983) and New York Yankees (1985). He was the pitching coach for the Chicago White Sox from July 22, 2002, until the end of the 2020 season. Under his tutelage, both Mark Buehrle and Philip Humber pitched perfect games (with the former also getting a no-hitter), Lucas Giolito pitched a no-hitter, and the White Sox won the 2005 World Series. On October 12, 2020, Cooper and the White Sox parted ways after 32 seasons with the organization at various levels.

Early life
Cooper attended Monsignor McClancy Memorial High School (class of 1974) and the New York Institute of Technology on a college baseball and basketball scholarship.

Playing career

Cooper was drafted by the New York Yankees in the 17th round (442nd overall) of the 1978 Major League Baseball Draft. After the 1980 season, he was selected by the Minnesota Twins from the Yankees in the Rule 5 draft.

Cooper played for the Twins in 1981 and 1982, before being traded to the Toronto Blue Jays for Dave Baker on December 10, 1982. On March 13, 1984, Cooper was traded to the Yankees for outfielder Derwin McNealy. 

Cooper signed with the Oakland Athletics for the 1986 season, appearing only in the minor leagues. In 44 MLB games (three starts) spread over four seasons, Cooper compiled a 1–6 record with a 5.27 ERA.

Coaching career
Cooper had worked in the White Sox organization since 1988, when he served as a minor league pitching coach for the Single-A South Bend Silver Hawks. He also served as pitching coach for the Single-A Advanced Sarasota White Sox from 1989 through 1991 and the Double-A Birmingham Barons in 1992. He became the White Sox minor league pitching coordinator from 1993 through 2002, aside from serving as pitching coach for the Triple-A Nashville Sounds in 1995 and 1996.

Cooper became the White Sox pitching coach in July 2002, replacing Nardi Contreras. With the departure of Ozzie Guillén on September 26, 2011, and Joey Cora on September 27, 2011, Cooper became the 38th manager of the White Sox, filling the role for the final two games of the 2011 season before yielding the position to Robin Ventura.

Cooper was one of the longest tenured pitching coaches in MLB. He told the Chicago Sun-Times in 2018, "I love being part of young people’s lives helping them achieve the dreams they’re dreaming about. That’s what I’m into.’’

Cooper, along with White Sox manager Rick Renteria, were fired on October 12, 2020, after an early playoff exit in the American League Wild Card Series against the Oakland Athletics.

Cooper and his wife have a son and two daughters. They make their home in Brentwood, Tennessee.

Managerial record

References

External links

1956 births
Living people
American expatriate baseball players in Canada
Baseball coaches from New York (state)
Chicago White Sox coaches
Chicago White Sox managers
Columbus Clippers players
Fort Lauderdale Yankees players
Fort Myers Sun Sox players
Major League Baseball pitchers
Major League Baseball pitching coaches
New York Institute of Technology alumni
Minnesota Twins players
Minor league baseball coaches
Nashville Sounds players
New York Yankees players
NYIT Bears baseball players
Oneonta Yankees players
Rochester Red Wings players
St. Lucie Legends players
Syracuse Chiefs players
Toledo Mud Hens players
Toronto Blue Jays players
West Haven Yankees players
Baseball players from New York City
NYIT Bears men's basketball players